The 2021 AFL Women's draft consists of the various periods when the 14 clubs in the AFL Women's competition can recruit players prior to the competition's 2022 season.

Special assistance
As a condition of receiving assistance, the clubs were required to use at least five selections at the upcoming draft.

Signing and trading period 
Players can be signed for one or two year contracts. The trade period opened on 31 May 2021 and will close on 9 June 2021. Players can be re-signed until 16 June 2021.

Retirements and delistings

Trades

Delisted free agency 
The delisted free agency period will close on 25 June 2021.

Rookie signings 
In the absence of a rookie draft, each club was permitted to sign players that had not played Australian rules football within the previous three years or been involved in an AFLW high-performance program.

Inactive players 
Following final list lodgements, a number of players experienced changing circumstances that made them unable to participate in the 2022 season. Clubs were granted permission to place these players on an inactive list, gaining end of draft selections to replace them for the one season. Players on each club's inactive list ahead of the 2022 season are listed below:

Draft

Free agency and replacement signings 
Where players were moved to inactive list after the draft had taken place, club were entitled to replace them by free agency signing.

Train on players 
Where multiple players were ruled unable to play due to Covid-19 related health and safety protocols, clubs were entitled to field up to five train on players to enable them to field a full side.

See also 
 2021 AFL draft

References 

AFL Women's draft
2021 AFL Women's season
AFL Women's draft